The 1936 Philadelphia Athletics season involved the A's finishing eighth in the American League with a record of 53 wins and 100 losses.

Offseason 
Tom Shibe, eldest son of former owner Ben Shibe, died on February 16, 1936. Connie Mack supported Tom's brother, John Shibe, as club president, and he was named to the position on February 24.

Notable transactions 
 December 10, 1935: Jimmie Foxx and Johnny Marcum were traded by the Athletics to the Boston Red Sox for Gordon Rhodes, George Savino (minors), and $150,000.

Regular season 
In August, John Shibe was forced to step down from his position as acting club president.

Season standings

Record vs. opponents

Roster

Player stats

Batting

Starters by position 
Note: Pos = Position; G = Games played; AB = At bats; H = Hits; Avg. = Batting average; HR = Home runs; RBI = Runs batted in

Other batters 
Note: G = Games played; AB = At bats; H = Hits; Avg. = Batting average; HR = Home runs; RBI = Runs batted in

Pitching

Starting pitchers 
Note: G = Games pitched; IP = Innings pitched; W = Wins; L = Losses; ERA = Earned run average; SO = Strikeouts

Other pitchers 
Note: G = Games pitched; IP = Innings pitched; W = Wins; L = Losses; ERA = Earned run average; SO = Strikeouts

Relief pitchers 
Note: G = Games pitched; W = Wins; L = Losses; SV = Saves; ERA = Earned run average; SO = Strikeouts

Farm system

References

External links 
1936 Philadelphia Athletics team page at Baseball Reference
1936 Philadelphia Athletics team page at www.baseball-almanac.com

Oakland Athletics seasons
Philadelphia Athletics season
Oakland